Bezmiara Kadın ("adorned banquet";  died 1909) was the second legal wife of the Sultan Abdulmejid I of the Ottoman Empire.

Early life
Of Circassian origin, Bezmiara Kadın was the adoptive daughter of Fatma Zehra Hanım known as "Mısırlı Hanım," the daughter of Mehmed Arif Pasha, and granddaughter of grand vizier Halil Hamid Pasha. She was the wife of Ismail Kamil Pasha, the son of Muhammad Ali of Egypt, After Ismail Pasha's death she moved to Istanbul, and settled in Halil Hamid Pasha's palace located in Akıntıburnu.

First marriage
One day, when Abdulmejid was in his twenties, he visited Mısırlı Hanım. Here he saw Bezmiara, who played piano, and fell in love with her. He asked her hand in marriage, but Bezmiara flatly refused. However, she soon consented to his proposal. The marriage took place in 1847, and she was given the title of "Fifth Ikbal".

In 1848, she was elevated to the title of "Fourth Ikbal". On 22 February 1850, she gave birth to her only child, a daughter, Mükbile Sultan in the Çırağan Palace, who died at the age of two months. In the same year she was elevated to the title of "Third Ikbal". In 1853, she was elevated to the title of "Senior Ikbal", and in 1854 to the title of "Fifth Kadın".

Abdulmejid not only loved Bezmiara but esteemed her. He had her moved to a pleasant galley which he had presented to her. Here she formed an intimate relationship with a certain Tevfik Pasha.

Second marriage
Bezmiara divorced Abdulmejid and married Tevfik Pasha on 2 June 1859.  Although the sultan's ministers had required her, in the divorce agreement, to never remarry, as it would have been an insult to the sultan, she ignored them. Abdülmejid did not punish her, despite the invitation to do so, but gave the couple a palace owned by the Crown. When Sultan Abdulaziz ascended the throne after the death of his brother in 1861, he relocated Tevfik and Bezmiara to Bursa. The two divorced soon after, and Tevfik was put to death in 1865.
The couple had a daughter named Emine Cavidan Hanım born on 28 October 1862 in Istanbul. After her birth her parents divorced.

Cavidan married Abdulmejid and Serfiraz Hanım's son, Şehzade Selim Süleyman in 1886. After the two divorced, she married Prince Hüseyin Bey of Egypt on 2 February 1891, and after his death in 1898, she married Osman Pasha.

Third marriage
After her divorce, Bezmiara married the director of Bursa Awqaf, Uzun Ahmed Bey. The couple divorced After some years. She returned to Istanbul, where she had a troubled life.

Issue

In literature
Bezmiara is a character in Hıfzı Topuz's historical novel Abdülmecit: İmparatorluk Çökerken Sarayda 22 Yıl: Roman (2009).

See also
Kadın (title)
Ottoman Imperial Harem
List of consorts of the Ottoman sultans

Annotations

References

Sources

19th-century people from the Ottoman Empire
Year of death unknown
People from the Ottoman Empire of Circassian descent
Circassian nobility
Year of birth unknown
Consorts of Abdulmejid I